Orlov (masculine) or Orlova (feminine) is a Russian last name shared by the following people:

People
Orlov (family), a Russian noble family
Aleksandr Orlov (disambiguation), several people
Aleksey Orlov (politician) (b. 1961), Russian-Kalmyk politician
Alexei Grigoryevich Orlov (1737-1808), Russian military leader
Alina Orlova, Lithuanian singer-songwriter
Boris Orlov (disambiguation), several people
Dal Orlov (1935–2021), Russian film critic, journalist, and screenwriter
Dmitri Orlov, Russian hockey player
Dmitry Orlov (disambiguation), several people
Dorothy Orlov (mother of actor Paul Michael Glaser)
Georgi Orlov (1884–1941), Russian-Estonian politician
Igor Orlov, several people
Ivan Orlov (aviator) (1895-1917), World War I flying ace
Ivan Orlov (philosopher) (1886–1936), philosopher
Jakob Orlov (b. 1985), Swedish footballer
Janina Orlov (b. 1952), Finnish-Swedish translator
Lyubov Orlova (1902–1975), Soviet actress
Marina Orlova (actress), Russian actress
Marina Orlova (Internet celebrity), YouTube celebrity philologist
Mikhail Orlov (racewalker) (b. 1967), Russian race walker
Natalya Orlova (born 1969), Russian politician
Nikolay Alexeyevich Orlov (1827–1885), Russian diplomat
Nikolai Andreyevich Orlov (1892–1964), Russian pianist
Oleg Petrovich Orlov (b. 1953), Russian biologist, post-Soviet human rights activist
Raisa Orlova (1918-1989), Russian writer and American studies scholar
Sergei Orlov (disambiguation), multiple people
Svetlana Orlova (disambiguation), multiple people
Vasily Orlov-Denisov (1775–1843), Russian cavalry general
Vladimir Orlov (speed skater)  (b. 1938), Russian speed skater
Vladimir Aljakseevich Orlov (b. 1953), also known as Uładzimir Arłou, Belarusian historian, writer, politician, and poet
Vladimir Mitrofanovich Orlov (1895–1938), Soviet military leader
Yuri Orlov (1924–2020), Soviet nuclear physicist, dissident and a human rights activist

Fictional characters
Aleksandr Orlov, an anthropomorphic meerkat from the Compare the Meerkat advertising campaign
Bo Orlov, a character in the Netflix series  Grand Army
General Orlov, a villain in the James Bond film Octopussy
Yuri Orlov, arms dealer and central character of the film Lord of War

See also
Akvilev

Russian-language surnames
Bulgarian-language surnames